Winter is a surname.

Geographical distribution
As of 2014, 40.7% of all known bearers of the surname Winter were residents of Germany (frequency 1:992), 22.9% of the United States (1:7,932), 9.5% of England (1:2,952), 4.4% of Austria (1:974), 3.9% of Australia (1:3,034), 3.4% of Brazil (1:30,666), 3.0% of Canada (1:6,132), 1.7% of the Netherlands (1:4,879), 1.4% of South Africa (1:20,013) and 1.3% of France (1:26,529).

In Austria, the frequency of the surname was higher than national average (1:974) in the following states:
 1. Lower Austria (1:671)
 2. Salzburg (1:798)
 3. Vienna (1:802)
 4. Styria (1:848)

In Germany, the frequency of the surname was higher than national average (1:992) in the following states:
 1. Bremen (1:674)
 2. Mecklenburg-Vorpommern (1:695)
 3. Hesse (1:719)
 4. Saxony-Anhalt (1:737)
 5. Saarland (1:831)
 6. Saxony (1:839)
 7. Bavaria (1:887)
 8. Brandenburg (1:895)
 9. Thuringia (1:910)
 10. Lower Saxony (1:977)

In England, the frequency of the surname was higher than national average (1:2,952) in the following counties:
 1. East Sussex (1:1,284)
 2. County Durham (1:1,291)
 3. Isle of Wight (1:1,470)
 4. Cumbria (1:1,521)
 5. Northumberland (1:1,597)
 6. East Riding of Yorkshire (1:1,637)
 7. Tyne and Wear (1:1,638)
 8. Somerset (1:1,698)
 9. Bristol (1:1,766)
 10. Lincolnshire (1:1,864)
 11. Hampshire (1:2,018)
 12. Dorset (1:2,102)
 13. Norfolk (1:2,143)
 14. Surrey (1:2,150)
 15. Rutland (1:2,232)
 16. Kent (1:2,259)
 17. Hertfordshire (1:2,270)
 18. Gloucestershire (1:2,288)
 19. Cambridgeshire (1:2,464)
 20. Bedfordshire (1:2,476)
 21. Wiltshire (1:2,581)
 22. Buckinghamshire (1:2,592)
 23. Berkshire (1:2,593)
 24. Devon (1:2,596)
 25. South Yorkshire (1:2,780)
 26. West Sussex (1:2,835)
 27. North Yorkshire (1:2,910)
 28. Nottinghamshire (1:2,922)

Disambiguation pages
 Edward Winter (disambiguation), multiple people
 John Winter (disambiguation), multiple people
 Michael Winter (disambiguation), multiple people
 Ralph Winter (disambiguation), multiple people
 William Winter (disambiguation), multiple people

Arts and entertainment
 Agnes-Nicole Winter (born 1956), Swedish television personality
 Alex Winter (born 1965), British-American actor and director
 Amalie Winter (1802–1879), poet and novelist
 Andrew Winter (1893–1958), American artist
 Andy Winter, British comics writer
 Ariel Winter (born 1998), American actress and voice actress
 Carl Winter (1906–1966), British art historian and museum curator
 Chelsea Winter, New Zealand celebrity chef, entrepreneur, food writer, and television personality
 Claude Winter (1931–2011), actress
 Cris Winter, radio personality
 Damon Winter (born 1974), New York based photographer
 David Alexandre Winter (born 1943), Dutch-born pop singer
 Donovan Winter (?–2015), British film director, actor, and writer
 Dorothea Winter (1949–2012), German recorder player and recorder teacher
 Edgar Winter (born 1946), American  musician
 Eric Winter (born 1976), American  actor
 Ethel Winter (1924–2012), American dancer and dance instructor
 Ezra Winter (1886–1949), prominent American muralist
 Faith Winter (artist) (1927–2017), British sculptor
 Faye Winter (born 1995), English television personality
 Fritz Winter (1905–1976), German painter
 Glen Winter, Canadian television director, cinematographer, and producer
 Guilherme Winter (born 1979), Brazilian actor
 H. Edward Winter (1908–1976), American enamel artist
 Harald Winter (born 1953), artist
 Harry A. Winter (1889–1969), lawyer, journalist, judge, and political figure
 Harry Winter (1914–2001), German-Austrian singer, musician, and band director
 Johnny Winter (1944–2014), American singer, songwriter, musician
 Julia Winter (born 1993), Swedish-British actress
 Katia Winter (born 1983), Swedish actress
 Kurt Winter (1946–1997), Canadian guitarist
 Laska Winter (1905–1980), American actress
 Ophélie Winter (born 1974), French singer and actress
 Paul Winter (born 1939), American musician
 Peter Winter (1754–1825), German dramatic composer
 Ralph Winter (producer) (born 1952), American film producer
 Ronnie Winter, lead singer of The Red Jumpsuit Apparatus
 Samira Winter (born 1991), singer in the pop band Winter
 Terence Winter (born 1960), Emmy Award-winning American screenwriter and television producer
 Thelma Frazier Winter (1908–1977), American ceramist
 Veronika Winter (born 1965), German soprano
 Vincent Winter (1947–1998), Scottish child actor

Business 
 Benjamin Winter, Sr. (1882–1944), American real estate developer
 Edwin Winter (1845–?), president of Northern Pacific Railway
 Eirik Winter, international banker

Journalism and literature
 Alice Ames Winter (1865–1944), American litterateur, author, clubwoman, suffragist
 Brenno de Winter (born 1971), Dutch ICT and investigative journalist
 Douglas E. Winter (born 1950), American author and editor
 Henry Winter (born 1963), British journalist
 John Strange Winter (1856–1911), pen-name of Henrietta Eliza Vaughan Stannard, English novelist
 Robert Winter (1924–2019), Californian historian 
 Samuel Vincent Winter (1843–1904), Australian newspaperman and mayor of Richmond, Victoria
 Zikmund Winter (1846–1912), Czech novelist and historian

Military
 August Winter (1897–1979), German general
 Donald C. Winter (born 1947), US Secretary of the Navy
 Ormonde Winter (1875-1962), British general and intelligence officer

Politics and law
Beth Winter, British Member of Parliament elected 2019
 Bob Winter (born 1937), Lord Provost of Glasgow
 Brad Winter (born 1952), American politician from the state of New Mexico
 Elmer Winter (1912–2009), American lawyer who co-founded the Manpower Inc.
 Faith Winter (born 1980), U.S. legislator
 Frank Winter (1906–1976), South Island Māori leader
 Gordon Arnaud Winter (1912–2003), Canadian politician
 Harrison Lee Winter (1921–1990), United States federal judge
 James Spearman Winter (1845–1911), Canadian politician
 Klaus Winter (1936–2000), German judge
 Ludwig Georg Winter (1778–1838), German politician
 Martin Winter (mayor) (born 1962), Mayor of Doncaster, England
 Ralph K. Winter Jr. (1935–2020), American judge
 Steven Winter, American law professor
 Ty Winter, American politician from Colorado

Religion 
 Allen Winter (1903–1997), Anglican Bishop
 Bruce W. Winter (born 1939), conservative evangelical New Testament scholar
 Colin Winter (1928–1981), English Anglican bishop
 Cornelius Winter (1742–1808), Methodist preacher
 Daniel Winter, one of the three main founders of the Orange Order
 Miriam Therese Winter (born 1938), Catholic theologian
 Terry Winter (televangelist) (1942–1998), Canadian religious leader

Sciences
 Andreas Winter (born 1971), German mathematician and mathematical physicist
 Ernst Florian Winter (1923–2014), Austrian-American historian and political scientist
 Ernő Winter (1897–1971), engineer who developed barium lamps
 George D. Winter (1927–1981), British medical researcher
 Greg Winter (fl. 2000s), British antibodies researcher
 Hannspeter Winter (1941–2006), Austrian plasma physicist
 Heinrich Georg Winter (1848–1887), German mycologist

Sports
 Adrian Winter (born 1986), Swiss professional footballer
 Andy Winter (born 2002), Scottish footballer
 Aron Winter (born 1967), Dutch footballer
 Arthur Winter (1844–1937), English priest and cricketer
 Blaise Winter (born 1962), American football coach and former player
 Brian Winter (born 1968), Scottish former football referee
Cliff Winter (1884–1918), English footballer
 Elaine Winter (athlete) (born 1932), South African sprinter
 Elaine Winter (figure skater) (1895–?), German figure skater
 Fred Winter (1926–2004), British National Hunt racing racehorse jockey and trainer
 Nick Winter (1894–1955), Australian athlete
 Peter Winter (athlete) (born 1971), Australian decathlete
 Rudolf Winter, Czechoslovakian 1928 Olympic sailor
 Stefan Winter (born 1988), German national ski mountaineering coach and alpine sports author
 Tex Winter (1922–2018), American basketball coach
 Trevor Winter (born 1974), American basketball player

Other
 Christopher Winter (pirate), English pirate active in the Caribbean
 David A. Winter (1930–2012), distinguished professor emeritus of the University of Waterloo
 Ella Winter (1898–1980), Australian-British journalist and activist
 Elly Winter (1898–1987), German communist and notable political activist
 Howie Winter (1929–2020), American convicted criminal
 Jay Winter (born 1945), Professor of History
 Miriam Winter (1933–2014), German Nazi Holocaust survivor
 Solomon Winter (1778–1859), Hungarian philanthropist
 Timothy Winter (born 1960), British Islamic scholar

See also
 Winters (name)
 Winterson
 De Winter (surname)
 Wynter (disambiguation), includes list of people with name Wynter

References

Surnames
English-language surnames
German-language surnames
Jewish surnames
Dutch-language surnames
Surnames from nicknames